Gervase Frederick Mathew (11 February 1842 – 10 February 1928) was an English naval officer and entomologist.

Gervase Mathew  was born in Barnstaple and educated at Barnstaple Grammar School and Blundell's School. He entered the Royal Navy as Assistant Clerk 12 December 1860, was promoted to Assistant Paymaster 15 February 1865, then to Paymaster 9 February 1879 and 
retired as Paymaster-in-Chief 11 February 1902. One of his early appointments was to the Warrior, the first British ironclad.

He was sometime based in the Mediterranean then at Sydney and in Fiji and travelled extensively in the central Pacific. He introduced Edward Meyrick to the fauna of the central Pacific islands. Gervase Mathew was a Fellow of the Entomological Society of London the Zoological Society of London and the Linnean Society.

His collection and Types were sold to Godman and are now in the collection of the Natural History Museum, London.
His works include:

 List of Lepidoptera forwarded to Edward Newman Entomologist 7(127):62-66 (1874)
 Life history of Papilio archidamas  Entomologist's Monthly Magazine 14(163): 152-153 (1877)
 List of Lepidoptera observed in the neighbourhood of Gallipoli Turkey, in 1878. Entomologist's Monthly Magazine 18: 10-13, 29-32, 92- (1881)
 Life history of Callidryas drya, Boisd Entomologist's Monthly Magazine 18(214): 219-220 (1882)
 Remarks on some Central American species of Pyrrhopyge, Hubn Entomologist's Monthly Magazine 19(217): 18-19 (1882)
 An afternoon among the butterflies of Thursday Island. Entomologist 19:33-36, 84-97 9 (1885)
  Life history of three species of Western Pacific Rhopalocera.Trans.Ent. Soc. Lond. 1885: 357-67, pl. X. (1885)
Descriptions of some new species of Rhopalocera from the Solomon Islands. Proc. zool. Soc. Lond. 1886(3): 343-350, illustrations. 
 Life-histories of Rhopalocera from the Australian region, Trans. Ent. Soc. Lond. (1888), pp. 137–188 (1888)
 Notes on the Lepidoptera from the Mediterranean Entomologist, 31: 77-84, 108-116,. 141 (1898)
 Descriptions and life-histories of new species of Rhopalocera from the Western Pacific Trans. ent. Soc. Lond. 37(2): 311-315 (1889)
 Butterflies attracted by human perspiration Entomologist 55(708):112-113 (1922)

References
Anon., 1928 Entomologists's Record and Journal of Variation'' Vol. XL. No. 1. 15 January 1928:47 

English lepidopterists
People educated at Blundell's School
Royal Navy officers
Fellows of the Royal Entomological Society
Fellows of the Zoological Society of London
Fellows of the Linnean Society of London
1928 deaths
1842 births
People educated at Barnstaple Grammar School
Royal Navy logistics officers